Zobida avifex is a moth of the subfamily Arctiinae first described by Lars Kühne in 2010. It is found in South Africa and Zimbabwe.

References

Moths described in 2010
Lithosiina
Lepidoptera of South Africa
Lepidoptera of Zimbabwe
Moths of Sub-Saharan Africa